This is the order of battle for the 2022 Russian invasion of Ukraine.

Russian and other forces

Initial groupings: February 2022
Ukrainian military commentator Yuri Butusov presented the following initial February 2022 deployment of the Russian forces:

Southwestern Belarus grouping (blocking contingent against Ukrainian forces in Western Ukraine):
 located around Brest, Luninets, Baranovichi, Osipovichi and Minsk
 including forces from the Northern Fleet (200th (Arctic) Motor Rifle Brigade, 61st Guards Naval Infantry Brigade) and the VDV (76th and 98th Guards airborne divisions), estimated strength of 6–7 battalion tactical groups

Southeastern Belarus grouping (Kyiv offensive direction):
 located around Vepri, Elsin, Bragin, Khainini, Rechitsya and Mozir
 including forces from the 5th, 35th and 36th Combined Arms Armies, estimated strength of 7–9 battalion tactical groups

Bryansk grouping (Chernihiv offensive direction):
 located around Klimovo, Klintsi, Pochep and Sevsk
 including forces from the 41st Combined Arms Army and the 90th Guards Tank Division, estimated strength of 3 battalion tactical groups

Kursk – Belgorod grouping (Sumy offensive direction):
 located around Tomarovka, Vesela Lopan', Zorino, Pristen', Kursk and Belgorod
 including forces from the 6th and 20th combined arms armies, estimated strength of 4 battalion tactical groups

Voronezh grouping (Kharkiv offensive direction):
 located around Stariy Oskol, Soloti, Valuyki, Boguchar, Pogonovo and Voronezh
 including forces from the 6th Tank and 20th combined arms armies, estimated strength of 13–14 battalion tactical groups

Smolensk grouping (operational reserve of the northern front)
 located around Yel'nya
 including forces from the 20th and 41st combined arms armies, estimated strength of 6–7 battalion tactical groups

Rostov grouping (Donbas and eastern Sea of Azov offensive direction)
 located around Rostov-on-the-Don and Kamensk-Shakhtinskiy
 including forces from the 8th Combined Arms Army, estimated strength of 6 battalion tactical groups
 Ukraine says the 8th CAA has operational control over the Donetsk People's Republic People's Militia and the Luhansk People's Republic People's Militia, naming them the Russian 1st and 2nd Army Corps

Crimea grouping (southern Ukraine offensive direction):
 located around the Crimean Peninsula (Slavne, Dzhankoy, Novoozerne, Yevpatoriya, Sevastopol, Oktyabrskoye, Bakhchisaray, Angarskiy, Feodosiya, Opuk)
 including forces from the 58th Combined Arms Army and the Black Sea Fleet's 22nd Army Corps (810th Guards Naval Infantry Brigade), estimated strength of up to 13 battalion tactical groups

Kuban grouping (operational reserve of the southern front)
 located around the Kuban Peninsula (Novorossiysk, Korenovsk, Primorsko-Akhtarsk, Krasnodar, Mol'kino and Maykop) and Stavropol
 including forces from the 49th Combined Arms Army, the Black Sea Fleet's 22nd Army Corps and the VDV's 7th Guards (Mountain) Air Assault Division, estimated strength of 6 battalion tactical groups

Leaders 
 Aleksandr Dvornikov (8 April 2022 - 25 June 2022): placed in overall charge of military operations in Ukraine, effectively ending the grouping system

 Gennady Zhidko (26 June 2022 - 7 October 2022): appointed by Vladimir Putin to the top position, replacing Dvornikov

 Sergey Surovikin (8 October 2022 - 11 January 2023): previously commander of the Aerospace Forces and Army Group South, replacing Zhidko in overall command

 Valery Gerasimov (12 January 2023 - present): appointed commander of military operations in Ukraine, with Surovikin as his deputy

Chain of command

  (President of the Russian Federation: Supreme Commander-in-Chief Vladimir Putin)
 Security Council
 Rosgvardiya  (General of the Army Viktor Zolotov; Deputy Commander Lieutenant General Roman Gavrilov)
 Kadyrovites (Head: Colonel general Ramzan Kadyrov)
 141st Motorised National Guard Regiment (Major General Magomed Tushaev)
 North Battalion
 Akhmat Special Forces
 OMON
 SOBR
 Federal Security Service (General of the Army Alexander Bortnikov)
 Russian Border Guards (Deputy Director of the Federal Security Service and Head of the Border Service: Vladimir Kulishov)
 Federal Protective Service (Director of the Federal Protective Service: General Dmitry Kochnev)
 Ministry of Internal Affairs (Minister of Internal Affairs: Vladimir Kolokoltsev)
 Police of Russia
 Mercenaries
 Wagner Group (Commander: Lieutenant Colonel Dmitry Utkin)
 DSHRG Rusich (Commander: Alexey Milchakov)
 Patriot
 Redut
 E.N.O.T. Corp. (Commander: Igor Mangushev)
 Ministry of Defence (Minister of Defence: General of the Army Sergei Shoigu) 
 Russian Armed Forces
 Russian General Staff (Chief of the General Staff: General of the Army Valery Gerasimov, First Deputy Chief of the General Staff Nikolay Bogdanovsky)
 National Defense Management Center (Colonel General Mikhail Mizintsev) 
 GRU (Director: Admiral Igor Kostyukov)
 8th Directorate - Directorate Spetsnaz (Spetsnaz GRU)
 2nd Separate Guards SpetsNaz Brigade (Colonel Konstantin Bushuev)
 10th Spetsnaz Brigade 
  (Colonel Sergey Polyakov ) (formerly Lieutenant Colonel Albert Karimov )
  (Colonel Eugene Gerasimenko , deputy commander Major Dmitri Vladimirovich Semenov )
 22nd Separate Guards SpetsNaz Brigade
 24th Separate Guards SpetsNaz Brigade
 Special Operation Forces (SSO) (Major General Valery Flyustikov)
 346th Spetsnaz Brigade
 Russian Ground Forces (Commander-in-Chief of the Russian Ground Forces and Deputy Minister of Defence: General of the Army Oleg Salyukov)
 Russian Engineer Troops (Lieutenant General Yuri Stavitsky)
 Russian Missile Troops and Artillery (Lieutenant-General Mikhail Matveyevsky)
 Russian Tank Troops
 Russian Air Defence Troops
 Army Aviation component
 Logistical Support of the Russian Armed Forces (Colonel General Mikhail Mizintsev, who replaced Army General Dmitry Bulgakov in September 2022)
 Russian Railway Troops
 Russian Aerospace Forces (Commander-in-Chief of the Aerospace Forces and Deputy Minister of Defence: General of Army Sergey Surovikin)
 Russian Air Force (Commander-in-Chief of the Russian Air Force and Deputy Commander-in-Chief of the Aerospace Forces: Lieutenant General )
 Russian Airborne Forces (Commander of the Russian Airborne Forces: Colonel-General Mikhail Teplinsky who replaced Colonel General Andrey Serdyukov in June 2022
 Russian Navy (Commander-in-Chief of the Russian Navy and Deputy Minister of Defence: Admiral Nikolai Yevmenov)
 Coastal Troops of the Russian Navy (Lieutenant General Viktor Astapov)
 Russian Naval Infantry (Lieutenant General )
 Russian Naval Aviation (Major-General Igor Kozhin)
 Joint Group of Forces 
 Central Military District (TsVO) (Commander: Lieutenant General Andrey Mordvichev from 17 February 2023 (formerly Major General Alexander Linkov) 
 Ground Forces
 2nd Guards Combined Arms Army, CMD (Major General )
 21st Guards Motor Rifle Brigade (Colonel Dmitri Zavyalov)
 30th Motor Rifle Brigade
 385th Guards Artillery Brigade
 41st Combined Arms Army, CMD (Lieutenant General , Deputy Commander Major General Andrei Sukhovetsky )
 35th Guards Motor Rifle Brigade
 55th Mountain Motor Rifle Brigade
 74th Guards Motor Rifle Brigade (Lieutenant Colonel Pavel Alekseyevich Yershov)
 90th Guards Tank Division (Colonel Ramil Rakhmatulovich Ibatullin) 
 6th Tank Regiment (Colonel Andrei Zakharov ) 
 80th Tank Regiment 
 239th Guards Tank Regiment - fought in Battle of Brovary, 9–10 March 2022.
 228th Motorized Rifle Regiment (Deputy Commander Lieutenant Colonel Fezul Bichikaev )
 400th Self-Propelled Artillery Regiment 
 201st Military Base, CMD (original location Tajikistan)
 202nd Motorized Rifle Regiment 
 28th Pontoon Bridge Brigade 
 Airborne Forces
 31st Guards Air Assault Brigade (Colonel Sergei Karasev ) 
 Eastern Military District (VVO)  (Commander: Lieutenant General Rustam Muradov  )
 Ground Forces
 5th Combined Arms Army, EMD (Lieutenant General )
 60th Motor Rifle Brigade
 127th Motor Rifle Division
 394th Motorized Rifle Regiment
 872nd Self-Propelled Artillery Regiment (Lieutenant Colonel Fyodor Evgenievich Solovyov )
 29th Combined Arms Army, EMD (Major General Andrei Borisovich Kolesnikov )
 36th Guards Motor Rifle Brigade (Lieutenant Colonel (Guards) Andrei Vladimirovich Voronkov)
 35th Combined Arms Army, EMD (Lieutenant General , Deputy Commander Major General Sergei Nyrkov [wounded, not returning to active duty])
 38th Guards Motor Rifle Brigade (Colonel Andrey Borisovich Kurbanov, Deputy Commander Major Sergey Masterov )
 64th Guards Motor Rifle Brigade (Lieutenant Colonel Azatbek Asanbekovich Omurbekov, allegedly responsible for the Bucha massacre) (effectively destroyed by September 2022) 
 165th Artillery Brigade
 69th Covering Brigade
 36th Combined Arms Army, EMD (Lieutenant General Valery Solodchuk, Deputy Commander Major General Andrei Anatolyevich Seritskiy, seriously wounded) 
 5th Guards Tank Brigade
 37th Guards Motor Rifle Brigade (Colonel Marat Hajibalaev ) (formerly Colonel Yuri Medvedev)
 30th Artillery Brigade 
 103rd Rocket Brigade
 68th Army Corps, EMD (Lieutenant General )
 39th Motor Rifle Brigade
 Naval Forces
 Naval Infantry of the Pacific Fleet
 40th Separate Naval Infantry Brigade
 155th Separate Guards Marine Brigade
 Airborne Forces
 11th Guards Air Assault Brigade (Major General Alexey Naumets , Colonel Denis Shishov, Deputy Commander Lieutenant Colonel Denis Viktorovich Glebov , Deputy Chief of Staff Lieutenant Colonel Pavel Kislyakov )
 83rd Guards Air Assault Brigade (Deputy Commander Guards Lieutenant-Colonel Vitaliy Slabtsov )
 Western Military District (ZVO) (Commander: Lieutenant General Yevgeny Nikiforov, (formerly Colonel General Sergei Kuzovlev ), (formerly Colonel General Alexander Lapin ) (replaced Lieutenant General Roman Berdnikov ) (replaced Lieutenant General Andrei Sychevoi ) (replaced Colonel General Alexander Zhuravlyov )
 Ground Forces
 1st Guards Tank Army, WMD (Lieutenant General  [dismissed]; unnamed deputy commander [dismissed])
 60th Command Brigade
 2nd Guards Motor Rifle Division (Deputy Commander Lieutenant Colonel Andriy Smirnov – seriously wounded)
 1st Guards Tank Regiment (Lieutenant Colonel Denis Lapin) 
 15th Guards Motor Rifle Regiment (Colonel Kharitonov – seriously wounded)
 147th Guards Self-Propelled Artillery Regiment
 4th Guards Tank Division (Colonel Yevgeny Nikolayevich Zhuravlyov)
 12th Guards Tank Regiment (S. I. Safonov) 
 13th Guards Tank Regiment
 423rd Guards Yampolsky Motor Rifle Regiment
 27th Guards Motor Rifle Brigade (Colonel Sergey Safonov)
 47th Guards Tank Division
 26th Tank Regiment
 6th Engineer Regiment (Colonel Mikhail Aleksandrovich Nagamov ) 
 49th Anti-Aircraft Rocket Brigade (Colonel Ivan Grishin )
 69th Logistics Brigade 
 
  
  
  (Lieutenant Colonel Oleg Evseev )
 6th Combined Arms Army, WMD (Lieutenant General Vladislav Nikolayevich Yershov [dismissed & arrested])
 25th Guards Motor Rifle Brigade
 138th Guards Motor Rifle Brigade (Colonel Sergei Maksimov)
 20th Guards Combined Arms Army, WMD (Lieutenant General )
 448th Rocket Brigade (Colonel Dmitri Nikolaevich Martynov)
 3rd Motor Rifle Division (Major General Aleksei Vyacheslavovich Avdeyev)
 
  (Colonel Igor Nikolaev )
 752nd Guards Motor Rifle Regiment
 144th Guards Motor Rifle Division (Lieutenant General Oleg Tsokov ,, previously Major General Vitaly Sleptsov) 
  (Colonel Alexander Bespalov )
  (Colonel I.A. Danshin)
 
 232nd Rocket Artillery Brigade
 3rd Army Corps
 72nd Motor Rifle Brigade
 Naval Forces
 11th Army Corps, from the Baltic Fleet (Lieutenant General Andrey Ruzinsky) 
 18th Motor Rifle Division
 
 244th Artillery Brigade
 14th Army Corps, from the Northern Fleet (Lieutenant-General Dmitry Krayev)
 80th Arctic Motor Rifle Brigade
 200th Motor Rifle Brigade, (Colonel Denis Yuryevich Kurilo ) 
 382nd Rocket Artillery Battalion (Lieutenant Colonel Dinar Khametov )
 61st Red Banner Naval Infantry Brigade (Colonel Kirill Nikolaevich Nikulin), from the Northern Fleet
 874th Marine Battalion (Lieutenant Colonel Dmitry Safronov )
 336th Guards Naval Infantry Brigade (Colonel (Guards) Igor N. Kalmykov, Chief of Staff Colonel Ruslan Shirin ), from the Baltic Fleet
 Airborne Forces
 76th Guards Air Assault Division
 104th Guards Air Assault Regiment (Lieutenant Colonel Alexander Dosyagaev ) 
 234th Guards Air Assault Regiment (Deputy Commander Lieutenant Colonel Aleksey Afonin )
 237th Guards Air Assault Regiment (Lieutenant Colonel Georgy Khudik )
 1140th Guards Artillery Regiment
 98th Guards Airborne Division (Guards Colonel Viktor Igoryevich Gunaza [dismissed by end of March], Head of Communications Colonel Alexey Smirnov )
 217th Guards Airborne Regiment (Guards Lt. Colonel Viktor Vasilyevich Droedov)
 331st Guards Airborne Regiment (Colonel Sergei Sukharev , Deputy Commander Lt. Colonel Ivan Pozdeev , Chief of Staff Lt. Colonel Igor Zharov ) (seriously depleted in fighting near Kyiv)
 1065th Guards Artillery Regiment 
 106th Guards Airborne Division (Guards Colonel Vladimir Vyacheslavovich Selivyorstov, Deputy Commander Colonel Sergey Igorevich Kuzminov , Deputy Armaments Commander Maxim Kudrin )
 51st Guards Airborne Regiment
 137th Guards Airborne Regiment (Colonel Andrey Vasilyev , Deputy Commander Lt. Colonel Pavel Krivov )
 45th Guards Spetsnaz Brigade (Colonel Vadim Pankov ) 
 Aerospace Forces
 6th Air and Air Defence Forces Army (Lieutenant General Oleg Makovetsky) 
 105th Guards Composite Aviation Division
 14th Guards Fighter Aviation Regiment (Sukhoi Su-30) (Deputy Commander Lieutenant Colonel Alexander Pazinich )
 47th Composite Aviation Regiment (Sukhoi Su-34) 
 159th Guards Fighter Aviation Regiment (Sukhoi Su-35) 
 790th Fighter Aviation Regiment (Sukhoi Su-35) 
 332nd Helicopter Regiment (Mil Mi-8, Mil Mi-24)
 11th Air and Air Defence Forces Army (Lieutenant General Vladimir Kravchenko)
 303rd Composite Aviation Division
 18th Guards Assault Aviation Regiment (Sukhoi Su-25) 
 23rd Guards Fighter Aviation Regiment (Sukhoi Su-35S) 
 112th Helicopter Regiment (Mil Mi-8, Mil Mi-24) (Major Roman Grovich ) 
 319th Helicopter Regiment (Mil Mi-24) 
 Southern Group of Forces (YuVO) (Commander: Colonel General Sergey Kuzovlev ) (formerly General of Army Sergei Surovikin),  
 Southern Military District (Commander: Colonel General Sergey Kuzovlev),  (replacing General of the Army Aleksandr Dvornikov) 
 Ground Forces
 8th Guards Combined Arms Army, SMD (Lieutenant General Andrey Nikolayevich Mordvichev, Deputy Commander Major General Esedulla Abachev  (replacing Major General Vladimir Petrovich Frolov )
 20th Guards Motor Rifle Division (Colonel Aleksei Gorobets ) (Deputy Commander Colonel Sergey Nikolaevich Kens ) (Deputy Commander Lieutenant Colonel Aleksey Yurievich Avramchenko ) (Deputy Commander Colonel Kanat Mukatov )
 33rd Motor Rifle Regiment (Lieutenant Colonel Yuri Agarkov ) 
 255th Motor Rifle Regiment 
 150th Motor Rifle Division (Major General Oleg Mityaev )
 102nd Motor Rifle Regiment
 163rd Guards Tank Regiment 
 49th Combined Arms Army, SMD (Lieutenant General Yakov Rezantsev ) 
 205th Separate Motor Rifle Brigade
 1st Guards Rocket Brigade
 227th Artillery Brigade (Colonel Aleksei Viktorovich Repin)
 32nd Engineer-Sapper Regiment 
 7th Military Base 
 58th Combined Arms Army (unknown, formerly Lieutenant General Mikhail Stepanovich Zusko) 
 19th Motor Rifle Division (Colonel Dmitri Ivanovich Uskov)
 429th Motor Rifle Regiment 
  
 42nd Guards Motor Rifle Division
 70th Motor Rifle Regiment (Lieutenant Colonel Andrei Bezlyudko )
 71st Motor Rifle Regiment
 291st Motor Rifle Regiment (Lieutenant Colonel Dibir Dibirov ) 
 136th Guards Motor Rifle Brigade (Colonel Roman Demurchiev) 
 12th Guards Engineering Brigade (Central Military District, Colonel Sergei Porokhnya , formerly Colonel Denis Kozlov )
 12th Anti-Aircraft Missile Regiment
 29th Railway Brigade
 Airborne Forces
 7th Guards Mountain Air Assault Division, Colonel Aleksandr Kornev, reported as the command element of the Russian task force fighting in the Kherson Oblast on the Mykolaiv direction
 56th Guards Air Assault Regiment
 108th Guards Air Assault Regiment (Colonel Vitaly Vladimirovich Sukuev )
 247th Guards Air Assault Regiment (Colonel Konstantin Zizievsky )
 171st Air Assault Battalion (Lieutenant Colonel Alexei Sharshavov )
 Naval Forces - Black Sea Fleet (Vice Admiral Viktor Nikolayevich Sokolov  replacing Admiral Igor Osipov, Deputy Commander Major General Dmitry Pyatunin  replacing First Rank Captain Andrei Paliy )
 Ships
 Cruiser
 Moskva (cruiser)  (Captain 1st Rank Anton Kuprin [allegedly KIA])
 Frigates
 Admiral Essen  
 Admiral Grigorovich 
 Admiral Makarov  
 Missile ships
 Tarantul-class corvette (Project 1241) (5) 
 Buyan-class corvette (Project 2163) (4) 
 Landing craft
 Project 1171 landing ship
 Saratov (Captain 2nd rank Vladimir Khromchenkov ) 
 Orsk 
 Nikolai Filchenkov 
 Project 775 landing ship (4)
 Caesar Kunikov  (Captain 3rd rank Aleksandr Chirva )
 Project 1176
 Ondatra-class landing craft D-106  
 Serna-class landing craft (Project 11770)  (deployed from the Caspian Flotilla)
 High-speed assault boat BK-16E (Project 02510) 
 Patrol Boats
 Project 22160
 Vasily Bykov 
 Dmitri Rogachov 
 Pavel Derzhavin 
 Raptor-class patrol boat (Project 03160)   (Captain 2nd rank Alexander Bobrov )
 Mine Sweepers
 Ivan Golubets (Project 266M minesweeper)  
 Tugs
 Vasily Bekh (Project 22870 rescue tug)  
 Vsevolod Bobrov (Project 23120 transport/tug)  
 Troops
 22nd Army Corps (Major General Arkady Marzoev, removed April 2022, chief of staff Major General Nasbulin )
 126th Guards Coastal Defense Brigade (Colonel Sergey Storozhenko.)
 127th Reconnaissance Brigade
 103rd Logistics Brigade (Colonel Mikhail Ponomarev, removed April 2022) 
 177th Naval Infantry Regiment - from the Caspian Flotilla
 388th Marine Reconnaissance Unit, from the Black Sea Fleet 
 810th Guards Naval Infantry Brigade (Colonel Sergey Kens , formerly Colonel Alexei Sharov , Deputy Commander Colonel Aleksei Berngard)
 Aviation
 2nd Guards Naval Aviation Division
 43rd Marine Assault Aviation Regiment 
 Aerospace Forces
 4th Air and Air Defence Forces Army (Lieutenant General Nikolai Vasilyevich Gostev)
 1st Guards Composite Aviation Division (Major General Tagir Gadzhiyev)
 3rd Guards Fighter Aviation Regiment (Sukhoi Su-27, Sukhoi Su-57) (Colonel Anatoly Stasyukevich )
 31st Guards Fighter Aviation Regiment (Sukhoi Su-30) (Deputy Commander Lieutenant Colonel Aleksey Khasanov )
 559th Bomber Aviation Regiment (Sukhoi Su-34)
 4th Composite Aviation Division
 960th Assault Aviation Regiment (Sukhoi Su-25)
 27th Composite Aviation Division
 37th Composite Aviation Regiment (Sukhoi Su-24, Sukhoi Su-25) 
 38th Fighter Aviation Regiment (Sukhoi Su-27) 
 39th Helicopter Regiment (Mil Mi-8, Mil Mi-28, Mil Mi35, Ka-52) (Deputy Commander Lieutenant Colonel Viktor Igorevich Pakholsky )
 55th Helicopter Regiment (Mil Mi-8, Mil Mi-24) 
 Long Range Aviation
 22nd Guards Heavy Bomber Aviation Division (Colonel Mykola Varpahovych)
 52nd Guards Heavy Bomber Aviation Regiment (Tupolev Tu-22M) (Colonel Oleg Timoshyn)

  (Supreme Commander-in-Chief: Head of the DPR Denis Pushilin)
 Donetsk People's Republic People's Militia (Major General Denis Sinenkov)
  (Lieutenant General Roman Kutuzov ) (under command of 8th Combined Arms Army of Southern Military District) 
 Republican Guard
 Pyatnashka Brigade
 Sparta Battalion (Yaroslav Shkurgan , formerly Vladimir Zhoga )
 Somalia Battalion (Timur Kurilkin)
 7th Motorised Rifle Brigade (Lieutenant Colonel Andrey Vladimirovich Panasyura ) 
 11th Motor Rifle Regiment (formerly Vostok)
 103rd Motor Rifle Regiment 
 105th Motor Rifle Regiment 
 107th Motor Rifle Regiment 
 109th Motor Rifle Regiment 
 113rd Motor Rifle Regiment 
 115th Motor Rifle Regiment 
 123rd Motor Rifle Regiment 
 125th Motor Rifle Regiment 
 127th Motor Rifle Regiment 

  (Supreme Commander-in-Chief: Head of the LPR Leonid Pasechnik')
 Luhansk People's Republic People's Militia
  (under command of 8th Combined Arms Army of Southern Military District)
 Prizrak Brigade (Yuri Shevchenko)
 Cossack battalions (Mikhail Kishchik , Deputy Chief of Staff Lt. Col. Alexander Kalnitsky )
 6th Cossack Regiment
 202nd Motor Rifle Regiment 
 204th Motor Rifle Regiment 
 208th Motor Rifle Regiment 
 254th Motor Rifle Regiment

Ukrainian forces

  (President:  Volodymyr Zelenskyy)
 Ministry of Defence of Ukraine (Minister of Defence Oleksii Reznikov)
 Chief Directorate of Intelligence (Major General Kyrylo Budanov)
 Kraken Regiment (Commander: Konstantin V. Nemichev)
 Ukrainian Armed Forces (Commander-in-Chief of the Armed Forces: General Valerii Zaluzhnyi, Deputy Commander-in-Chief of the Armed Forces of Ukraine: Lieutenant General Yevhen Moisiuk)
 Ukrainian General Staff (Chief of the General Staff: Lieutenant General Serhiy Shaptala)
 101st Brigade for the Protection of the General Staff (Commander: Colonel Mykola Shvets)
 Ukrainian Ground Forces (Commander of the Ground Forces: Lieutenant General Oleksandr Syrskyi)
 
 Ukrainian Armored Forces
 Ukrainian Rocket and Artillery Forces (Commander: Colonel Andriy Kolennikov)
 Ukrainian Mechanized Forces
 Ukrainian Army Aviation
 Territorial Defense Forces (Commander of the Territorial Defense Forces: Major General Ihor Tantsyura)
 Ukrainian Air Force (Commander of the Air Force: Lieutenant General Mykola Oleschuk)
 
 Ukrainian Navy (Commander of the Naval Forces: Vice Admiral Oleksiy Neizhpapa)
 Ukrainian Naval Infantry (Commander: Lieutenant General )
 Ukrainian Naval Aviation (Commander: Colonel Oleh Zahurskyi, Deputy commander: Colonel Ihor Bedzai )
 Ukrainian Air Assault Forces (Commander of the Air Assault Forces: Major General )
 Special Operations Forces (Commander of the Special Operations Forces: Brigadier General )
  (MU А0135), Kyiv, (Commander of JOC: Lieutenant General Serhiy Nayev)
  (Commander of the JFO: Major-General Eduard Moskalyov)
 Ukrainian Ground Forces
 Operational Command North (Commander: Major General Oleksandr Lokota)
 1st Tank Brigade (Commander: Colonel Ihor Shpak)
 1st Special Purpose Brigade (Commander: Colonel Oleg Uminskyi)
 4th Tank Brigade
 26th Artillery Brigade (Commander: Lieutenant Colonel Andranyk Hasparyan)
 27th Rocket Artillery Brigade
 30th Mechanized Brigade (Commander: Colonel Ihor Dovhan)
 58th Motorized Brigade
 72nd Mechanized Brigade (Commander: Colonel Ivan Vinnik)
 Operational Command West (Commander: Lieutenant General Oleksandr Pavlyuk)
 10th Mountain Assault Brigade (Commander: Colonel )
 14th Mechanized Brigade (Commander: Colonel Oleksandr Zhakun)
 24th Mechanized Brigade (Commander: Colonel Anatoly Shevchenko)
 44th Artillery Brigade
 53rd Mechanized Brigade
 24th Assault Battalion
 68th Jager Brigade (Commander: Colonel Yuriy Belyakov)
 128th Mountain Assault Brigade
 Operational Command East (Commander: Lieutenant General Serhiy Nayev)
 17th Tank Brigade (Commander: Lieutenant Colonel Oleksandr Tarnavskiy)
 54th Mechanized Brigade
 55th Artillery Brigade (Commander: Colonel Roman Kachur)
 92nd Mechanized Brigade (Commander: Lieutenant Colonel Pavlo Fedosenko)
 22nd Motorized Infantry Battalion
 93rd Mechanized Brigade (Commander: Colonel Vladislav Klochkov)
 107th Rocket Artillery Brigade
 Operational Command South (Commander: Major General Andriy Kovalchuk, Chief of Staff: Brigadier General Mykhailo Drapaty, Deputy commander: Brigadier General Andriy Hnatov)
 5th Tank Brigade
 28th Mechanized Brigade (Colonel Vitalii Huliaiev )
 40th Artillery Brigade
 56th Motorized Brigade
 57th Motorized Brigade
 59th Motorized Brigade (Commander: Colonel Vadym Sukharevsky)
 
 
 Separate Presidential Brigade (Commander: Colonel Pavlo Hora)
 Kakhovka operational group
 3rd Separate Assault Brigade
 3rd Tank Brigade
 
 19th Missile Brigade (Commander: Colonel )
 42nd Mechanized Brigade
 43rd Heavy Artillery Brigade (Commander: Colonel )
 49th Infantry Battalion
 63rd Mechanized Brigade (Commander: Colonel Oleksandr Marushchak)
 98th Infantry Battalion
 110th Mechanized Brigade (Commander: Colonel Mykola Chumak)
 115th Mechanized Brigade (Commander: Colonel Ihor Ivanov)
 214th Rifle Battalion
 Independent Formations
 Ukrainian Volunteer Corps
 2nd Separate Battalion
 Sheikh Mansur Battalion (Commander: Muslim Cheberloyevsky)
 Georgian Legion (Commander: Mamuka Mamulashvili)
 Kastuś Kalinoŭski Regiment (Commander: Dzianis Prokharau)
 Ukrainian Territorial Defense forces
 103rd Territorial Defense Brigade
 107th Territorial Defense Brigade
 112th Territorial Defense Brigade
 113th Territorial Defense Brigade
 114th Territorial Defense Brigade
 115th Territorial Defense Brigade
 118th Territorial Defense Brigade
 
 220th Battalion
 
 130th Territorial Defense Battalion
 227th Territorial Defense Battalion
 International Legion of Territorial Defense of Ukraine (Commander: Colonel Ruslan Miroshnichenko)
 Freedom of Russia Legion
 Pahonia Regiment
 Ichkerian Separate Special Purpose Battalion (Commander Hadzji-Murad Zumso, Deputy commander Khavazhi Amaev)
 Dzhokhar Dudayev Battalion
 Krym Battalion
 Norman Brigade
 Ukrainian Navy forces
 Sloviansk 
 Donbas 
 Ukrainian Naval Infantry Forces
 
 36th Marine Brigade (Commander: Lt. Col. Viktor Sikoza)
 Ukrainian Naval Aviation Forces
  (Commander: Colonel Ilya Oleynikov)
 Ukrainian Air Forces
 40th Tactical Aviation Brigade (Commander: Colonel Volodymyr Kravchenko)
 
 299th Tactical Aviation Brigade (Commander: Lieutenant Colonel Andriy Yastrebov)
 Ukrainian Anti-Aircraft Defense Rocket Forces
 
 
 160th Anti-Aircraft Artillery Brigade (Commander: Lieutenant Colonel Mykola Oleshiuk)
 Ukrainian Air Assault Forces
 25th Airborne Brigade (Commander: Colonel Yuriy Sodol)
 46th Airmobile Brigade
 71st Jaeger Brigade
 79th Air Assault Brigade (Commander: Colonel Oleksiy Shandr)
 80th Air Assault Brigade (Commander: Colonel Volodymyr Shvorak)
 81st Airmobile Brigade (Commander: Colonel Yevhen Moysyuk)
 95th Air Assault Brigade
 Ukrainian Special Operations Forces
 1st Special Purpose Detachment
 
 
 
 Ministry of Internal Affairs of Ukraine (Interior Minister: Ihor Klymenko)
 State Border Guard Service of Ukraine (Head of the State Border Guard Service of Ukraine)
 Ukrainian Sea Guard
 State Emergency Service of Ukraine
 National Guard of Ukraine (Commander: General Yuriy Lebid) 
 4th Rapid Reaction Brigade
 
 
 Special Operations Detachment Azov (Commander: Nikita Nadtochiy)
 2nd Special Operations Battalion Donbas (Commander: Lieutenant Colonel Oleksandr Polishchuk)
 Special Tasks Patrol Police
 Dnipro-1 Regiment
 Sich Battalion
 
 National Police of Ukraine (Chief: Police General 2nd Rank Ihor Klymenko)
 Rapid Operational Response Unit
 Security Service of Ukraine (Head of the Security Service of Ukraine: Brigadier General Vasyl Malyuk)
 Alpha Group
 Irregular civilian volunteers
 Paramilitary groups
 Ukrainian Volunteer Army (Commander: Dmytro Yarosh)
 Hospitallers Medical Battalion (Commander: Yana Zinkevych)
 Ukrainian People's Self-Defence
 Volunteer NGOS
 Aerorozvidka (Commander: Inna Honchar)
 Partisans
 Yellow Ribbon
 Popular Resistance of Ukraine
 Berdiansk Partisan Army

See also

 Army ranks and insignia of the Russian Federation
 Casualties of the Russo-Ukrainian War
 Combatants of the war in Donbas
 List of equipment of the Armed Forces of Ukraine
 List of equipment of the Russian Ground Forces
 List of equipment used by Russian separatist forces of the war in Donbas
 List of Russian generals killed during the 2022 invasion of Ukraine
 List of Russo-Ukrainian conflict military equipment

Notes

References

 
2022 Russian invasion of Ukraine